Crisis accommodation is housing provided to people experiencing temporary or ongoing conditions of mental or physical health challenges. It aims to remove them from an otherwise harmful environment and allowing them to improve their situations from a safe and stable environment.  Situations that may be alleviated through crisis accommodation include but are not limited to homelessness, domestic violence, elder abuse, and child abuse.  Crisis accommodation is typically provided through government organisations, not-for-profit organisations and charities. Crisis accommodation is also known as housing subsidies in other words. Crisis accommodation is provided everywhere around the world across various countries. There are other factors such as availability of the services and reasons like poverty and accumulation of debt that affect homelessness which needs to be taken into account in order to solve it as more people tend to look for urgent support when they are facing this crisis. 

Subsidising houses can be an effective way of preventing or reducing homelessness as housing is a basic right to every individual especially children. Solving this crisis can increase family reunification but they are complex than expected as the victims are mostly women and children. In the European countries, third sector organizations (NGOs) like faith-based charity do play some roles in providing temporary accommodation to the homeless. The National Survey of Homeless Assistance providers and clients in Australia stated that about thirty three percent of the homeless people are children. It is difficult to provide these services immediately as the victims are associated with no tenancy rights and their rights of occupants are generally weaker than a regular tenancy.

Causes 

Crisis accommodation has been an importance everywhere and it is due to various causes of homelessness. The major causes of homelessness and providing crisis accommodation are due to:

Mental health issues
Domestic violence
Poverty
Substance abuse problems

Individuals that are victims of these causes tend to look for immediate support and services like crisis accommodation. Individuals with mental health issues do need immediate support as they will not be able to live in their houses. If they are not supported, it can and may lead to negative consequences like depression, social and emotional disorders and suicidal behaviour. It is evident that people who experienced these issues even end up sleeping on streets as they were not able to receive services or support. Mental health issues can occur due to family conflicts, broken families, any types of abuse or stress. These issues occur due to the accumulation of financial debt or even deteriorating relationships that involves violence. Besides that, domestic violence is involved in deteriorating relationships which eventually causes the victims to run away from their houses to look for alternative accommodation services. Due to the lack of temporary accommodation in certain places, those victims are left with no choice but to return to the violent relationships. Leaving these victims to return to such situations may affect them in many other negative ways especially towards young children. Poverty is a cause of homelessness and such situations occur when a person or individual has little money, accumulation of financial debt, lack of education and many more. These circumstances cause people to lose their houses and also the right to tenancy and hence they become homeless. Emotional problems among young children may arise due to substances abuse problem like consuming drugs and alcohol. These young children will be affected mentally and physically as they become depressed and aggressive. These causes will lead individuals to seek for support and services like crisis accommodation to have a place to live in and also to ensure they are not homeless.

Challenges 
Providing crisis accommodation or temporary accommodation may help reduce homelessness but it takes a lot of effort, time, resources and also other factors to accomplish their goals. These challenges are faced by the government, non-government agencies and the homeless people involved. One of the main challenges faced by the homeless people is there is a severe lack in resources. Typically, these homeless victims search for services like crisis accommodation as they do not have adequate resources to move into their own houses or to sustain their living standards. The temporary accommodation is limited and they do not cater for a large number of people. Therefore, it requires a lot of effort and time from the victims in terms of application for these accommodations as many people would have applied for it the same time. Due to the lack of resources and housing options, some victims may experience social isolation by being distant from their preferred area. This add on the challenge by creating a greater duress on families which eventually will affect their mental health in terms of depression and stress. Hence, victims are exposed to violence and inappropriate behaviour. Younger children are affected as the environment is not suitable for them as their play, development and school performances becomes limited and restricted.

Homeless victims may feel unsafe in the houses provided to them because of the poor facilities and will be demoralised by their surrounding environment crisis. In some accommodations, they cater many people in a house and consumers especially women, are uncomfortable with it and they feel difficult and unsafe. Sharing is also a challenge to most victims as they find it difficult of being close or forced to interact with their house or roommates. Different victims have different preferences and needs which contradicts between the requirements of rational provision of services and the inmate demands. This lowers their self-esteem and confidence level which eventually causes them to isolate themselves in their respective rooms. Generally, women show lower self-esteems compared to men in these situations.

As for the government and non-government agencies, huge and serious investments are required by them in providing these temporary accommodations. Financial support becomes crucial and increases over time as it becomes concentrated at one place. It is difficult to solve homelessness as it requires big amount of resources, time for planning and effort to make it work. It is crucial and important for them because other issues or homelessness may arise if they do not take immediate action.

The lack of affordable housing makes it difficult to make private rental viable and sustainable. The public housing faces funding cuts as they are not able to help everyone at once but only to those whom are really in need. It is hard to make decisions of whom deserves the public housing as there are wide range and diversity of homeless victims.

Assistance and resources 
Assistance and resources are provided by the government and non-government agencies to help the homeless people overcome the crisis they experience and to improve their situations.  Assistance is provided everywhere around the world to those whom are in need and are at risk. These assistances currently are to be seen advertised everywhere through posters and advertisements. These are some examples of assistance and services provided in various countries:

 Housing First (United States of America)
 Normalisation (Norway)
 Right to Permanent Housing (Scotland)
 HomeGround Services (Australia)
 Strength to Change (United Kingdom)
 Covenant House (United States of America)
Coast Shelter (Australia)

Assistance is provided to homeless people to improve their living standards and  provide them opportunities to become independent. The goal of providing housing options is to ensure the safety of people, regardless of their gender. These housing options allow the victims to learn a set of skills so that they are able to maintain their homes. Legal supports like provision of police powers and provision of SHLV (Staying Home Leaving Violence) schemes are provided through these assistance programs to those whom are in need. Safe at Home scheme is integrated in Australia by the government and non-governmental agencies to support the homeless people. Programs are provided to homeless people to raise community awareness and educate them on children's homelessness, domestic and family violence, and boost their awareness about mental health. The government ensures that they adapt policies such as Housing Establishment Funds to help homeless families navigate from crisis housing to long-term housing of their own. It is equally important for the government to be aware of the need for adequate funding for homeless people. There are also schemes provided by non-government agencies to reduce homelessness and help prevent the use of crisis accommodation. These housing options provide advocacy and support services to help people improve their amenities and opportunities.

Solutions 
Reducing homelessness and uplifting homeless people’s standard of living to a better circumstance is the ultimate goal in every country. Providing temporary accommodation to the homeless people is a way of reducing homelessness but it is not a permanent solution. Every individual has their own role to play in reducing homelessness as a whole. More services like this and access to regular and permanent housing are being offered in every country to avoid people from sleeping on streets and risking their lives from any domestic violence or abuse. The government can and is gathering various organizations together to coordinate their responses by increasing the public spending on rental housing assistance and placing greater emphasis on service sectors in order to reduce homelessness. They are also paying attention in supervision to ensure the homeless people has adequate safety, basic needs, mental health services and secured housing. Increasing resources to support victims to move into a sustainable long-term housing is one of the goals of the government and non-governmental agencies. This will help victims exit from homelessness as they compete in private or public housing sectors to live in their own independent accommodation.

Family reconciliation would be an effective way in order to help support the homeless people especially younger children and those victims of higher risks like domestic violence, child abuse or elder abuse. It helps preserves their relationships by stopping any sort of violence. They are being supported and educated on living independently and safely as early intervention would be great for them. The organizations should keep in touch with victims and the families to track their needs and progress from time to time. Due to the lack of temporary accommodation in certain countries, some homeless people are given financial assistance so that they are able to secure an alternative accommodation if they are not accepted in any of these crisis accommodation services. It becomes much easier to supervise the victim’s behaviour, health and personal contacts to ensure their safety.

More affordable opportunities are and should be given to low income homeless people by allowing the government to work together with the housing market agencies. This will help improve the residential stability of the homeless victims. Providing an affordable, safe and comfortable environment to the homeless people should be taken into account and given more priorities. Adequate provision of good facilities and services should be prioritised in all the temporary accommodation for a better and healthy living. Legal and judicial measures are taken into account in order to keep these homeless victims safe from any high risk, violence and evictions. Certain ideal systems or standards should be set for those whom are accepted into the temporary accommodations. Adequate social support should be offered in a flexible basis to support those with difficulties in sustaining their tenancy.

Government and non-governmental agencies should support public and social housing tenants to move into private home ownership and hence providing more space in public housing which allows victims to have better circumstances. The Melbourne Apartment Project and Toronto’s Options for Home Scheme helps create space in the public housing by encouraging and helping victims to buy their own homes. They do provide psychological benefits to ensure these victims are in a safer and more comfortable environment. A mixture of housing and welfare policies is needed in building both social and private sectors to provide assistance, incentives and outreach support. Funds are being provided by the government to those whom are not accepted into the crisis accommodation due to the lack of spaces.

References 

Living arrangements
Homelessness
Homelessness solutions
Social work